Igor Vitalyevich Chudinov (born August 21, 1961) is a former Prime Minister of Kyrgyzstan. He was appointed to that position on December 24, 2007, following the resignation of Iskenderbek Aidaraliyev. Prior to his appointment, he was an energy and industry minister in the Kyrgyz government.

Chudinov was nominated for the position by the Ak Zhol party, which won a large majority of seats in the Kyrgyz parliament - the Jogorku Kenesh - in the elections of December 16, 2007. He was confirmed as prime minister by President Kurmanbek Bakiyev on December 24.

On 21 September 2009, Chudinov was named Honorary President of the Kyrgyz-North America Trade Council, in recognition of his role in promoting trade and investment between the USA/Canada and Kyrgyzstan.

As his surname implies, he is Russian of Chud heritage, and does not speak Kyrgyz.

References

External links 

1961 births
Living people
Ak Jol politicians
People from Bishkek
Prime Ministers of Kyrgyzstan
Kyrgyzstani people of Russian descent
Members of the Supreme Council (Kyrgyzstan)
Industry ministers of Kyrgyzstan